The Clean Water Protection Act was a bill introduced in the 111th United States Congress via the House of Representatives Subcommittee on Water Resources and Environment, of the Committee on Transportation and Infrastructure. It proposed to redefine "fill material" to not include mining "waste" under the Federal Water Pollution Control Act.

It was introduced by Frank Pallone and Chris Shays in the 110th Congress, and almost identical bills had been introduced in previous years. As of July 2009, H.R.1310 had 154 co-sponsors.  Environmental groups such as Appalachian Voices, Kentuckians for the Commonwealth and Sierra Club supported the legislation because of their stance against mountaintop removal mining.  It would also have affected situations similar to the Kensington Mine operation near Juneau, Alaska where a mine was permitted to discharge mining waste into a small lake as "fill."

See also 
Clean Water Act
Coeur Alaska, Inc. v. Southeast Alaska Conservation Council

References

External links 
 Text of H.R.1310 in Library of Congress Reference 

United States proposed federal environmental legislation
Water law in the United States
Waste legislation in the United States
Proposed legislation of the 107th United States Congress
Proposed legislation of the 108th United States Congress
Proposed legislation of the 109th United States Congress
Proposed legislation of the 110th United States Congress
Proposed legislation of the 111th United States Congress
Proposed legislation of the 112th United States Congress
Proposed legislation of the 113th United States Congress
Proposed legislation of the 114th United States Congress